Golden Peak High School (GPHS) is an English medium residential school established in 1991 with the sole iron determination of imparting pragmatic education to its students. It is situated at Saraswatinagar, Chabahil, Kathmandu.

References

External links 
 

Schools in Kathmandu
1991 establishments in Nepal